The 2009 IPC Alpine Skiing World Championships were held at High 1 resort, Pyeongchang, South Korea.

Events

Men

Women

Team

Medal table

Participating nations
25 nations participated.

References

Alpine skiing competitions in South Korea
World Para Alpine Skiing Championships